Blue Starr is a studio album by Kay Starr. It was released in 1957 by RCA Victor (catalog no. LPM-1549). It was her second album for RCA Victor. Hal Stanley was the producer.

Reception

Upon its release, Billboard magazine wrote: "Fans of the thrush from way back will find what they want here -- a pack of somewhat old-timey 'vocal Dixieland.' ... Tunes are all torchers, but tempi are varied."

AllMusic gave the album a rating of three stars. Reviewer William Ruhlmann wrote that the album "had the kind of jazz and blues playing that characterized Starr at her best, and she remained an expressive vocalist whose style was a bit too hot for the more polite supper clubs."

Track listing
Side A
 "It's A Old Lonesome Town (When You're Not Around)"
 "You're Driving Me Crazy (What Did I Do)"
 "The House Is Haunted (By the Echo of Your Last Good-Bye)"
 "We Three (My Echo, My Shadow and Me)"
 "I Really Don't Want to Know"

Side B
 "Blue Starr"
 "Wedding Bells"
 "It's Funny to Everyone but Me"
 "Little White Lies"
 "Just Like a Butterfly (That's Caught in the Rain)
 "Blue and Sentimental"

References

1957 albums
Kay Starr albums
RCA Victor albums